Jerusalem bus attack may refer to:

 Tel Aviv–Jerusalem bus 405 suicide attack, 6 July 1989
 2015 Jerusalem bus attack, 13 October 2015

See also 
 Jerusalem attack (disambiguation)